Hans Andreus (21 February 1926, Amsterdam – 9 June 1977, Putten) was the pseudonym of the Dutch poet and writer Johan Wilhelm van der Zant.

Van der Zant was born in Amsterdam. His parents divorced soon after his birth, his mother remarried, and the family lived in Scheveningen between 1930 and 1937 before moving back to Amsterdam. He started to write poems in 1939, and dropped out of school in 1940. In 1945, he studied for a while at the Amsterdamse Toneelschool, but also dropped out in 1947. Afterwards he worked as a corrector with De Volkskrant.

Andreus' debut work, the poetry book 'Muziek voor Kijkdieren', came out in 1951. His work is seen as part of the Dutch/Belgian literary movement known as 'De Vijftigers', a group of young poets started in the late 40s and connected to the COBRA movement, which also included Lucebert and Hugo Claus.

Besides poetry, Andreus also wrote a large number of children's books, the best known series of which revolves around the character 'Meester Pompelmoes'. Andreus stories for children are full of fantastical themes, playful, and written in a lyrical, rhythmical style. He received a number of prizes for his children's books, including a 'Zilveren Griffel' prize for his poetry book 'De Rommeltuin' and his book 'Meester Pompelmoes en de mompelpoes' won the CNPB Children's Book of the Year award in 1969 (a predecessor of the Gouden Griffel).

He also wrote a number of radio dramas, chansons, TV scripts and commercials, novels, and a novella.

References

1926 births
1977 deaths
20th-century Dutch poets
20th-century Dutch male writers
Dutch children's writers
Dutch male poets
Writers from Amsterdam
20th-century pseudonymous writers